Mateusz Haratyk (born 27 May 1998) is a Polish cross-country skier. He competed in the 15 kilometre classical and the 30 kilometre skiathlon at the 2022 Winter Olympics.

References

External links

1998 births
Living people
Polish male cross-country skiers
Cross-country skiers at the 2022 Winter Olympics
Olympic cross-country skiers of Poland
Cross-country skiers at the 2016 Winter Youth Olympics
Competitors at the 2023 Winter World University Games
People from Cieszyn County
21st-century Polish people